Shelly Cole is a former American actress.

Career
Born in Texas, Cole commenced her acting career appearing in TV movies and TV series. In 2003, she landed a main role in the film, Prey for Rock & Roll. One of her best-known roles was that of Madeline Lynn in Gilmore Girls, which she played from 2000 to 2004.

After retiring from acting, Cole has worked as an acting coach in Denver, Colorado. In 2018, she directed an independent film entitled Body Keepers.

Filmography

Film

Television

References

External links
 

1975 births
American film actresses
American television actresses
Living people
21st-century American women